Biggarsberg is a series of hills in KwaZulu-Natal, South Africa, stretching south of Glencoe and Dundee in a north western/south eastern direction. It is named for Alexander Biggar.

References 
 Op Pad in Suid-Afrika. B.P.J. Erasmus. 1995 

Mountains of South Africa